Luciano Emílio (born 12 December 1978) is a Brazilian former professional footballer who played as a striker.

Career

Early career
Emílio started playing professional soccer at the age of 16 in 1995, playing for XV de Piracicaba, a member of the state league of São Paulo. The next season, he transferred to Rio Branco, another team in the state league of São Paulo.

In 1997, Emílio signed with 1. FC Köln of the German Bundesliga. He played for the youth team and finally worked his way up to the senior team where he played for several matches.

In 1999, Emílio transferred to Alemannia Aachen, a team in the second Division of the Bundesliga.

Honduras and Mexico
In 2001, Luciano Emílio made a return to Brazil to play for União Barbarense. After a brief stint at União Barbarense, Emílio made a move to the Honduran league to play for Real España in Honduras. He quickly established himself as a key player and won the league scoring titles in 2003 and 2004. He helped lead Real España to the Apertura Championship in 2003. In 2004, Emílio made a move to another Honduran team, Olimpia. Emílio won another scoring title in the Apertura in 2004 with Olimpia.

Emílio enjoyed a brief stint in Mexico in 2005, signing the Mexican second division side Querétaro where he helped the team win the 2005 Clausura title, scoring 10 goals in the process. After playing for a short time with Querataro, Emílio made a return to CD Olimpia in 2005 in time to lead them to championships in the 2005 Apertura and the 2006 Clausura, during which he once again won the scoring title.  In 2006, Emílio's eight goals in the UNCAF Tournament were enough to propel his team to the 2007 CONCACAF Champions' cup.  Ironically, Emílio would go on to play against CD Olimpia in the 2007 CONCACAF Champions' Cup with his new club, D.C. United.

Major League Soccer
Emilio signed with D.C. United on 16 January 2007, as a Senior International player, after completing his second stint with Honduran club Olimpia. Emílio debuted for United in the 2007 CONCACAF Champions' Cup against Olimpia, scoring once in Tegucigalpa and twice in the return leg in Washington, DC in United's 7–3 aggregate win. He went on to score a fourth time in three games versus C.D. Guadalajara in the opening game of the CONCACAF semi-final.

At the end of his first season with D.C. United, his team received the 2007 MLS Supporters' Shield, the award for gaining the most points overall in a season. In the 2007 MLS season, Emílio had 20 goals and won the MLS Golden Boot award. Emílio won the 2007 MLS MVP award and the inaugural 2007 MLS Newcomer of the Year Award.

After recovering from a lean start to the 2008 season, Emílio scored his first career MLS hat-trick on 14 June against New York Red Bulls.

Though not originally signed under the Designated Player Rule, he later received a pay rise which took him over the maximum salary covered by the league, becoming a designated player.

Emílio received a green card in August 2009 for permanent residency in the United States and counted no longer against DC United's foreign player limit.

Emílio rejected a new contract with D.C. United that would have seen him sign at a significantly lower salary. He later joined former club Rio Branco, but on 28 April 2010, Emilio signed a three-month contract to return to former club D.C. United. He was released by D.C. United at the end of this short-term contract.

Later career
In August 2010, Emilio joined Uruguayan club Danubio, which plays in Primera División Uruguaya.

Emílio returned to Mexico to play for Atlante UTN in "La División de Ascenso" Mexico's Second Division for  the Clausura 2011 Tournament.

Career statistics

Club

Honours

Club
D.C. United
Major League Soccer Supporter's Shield: 2007
 Lamar Hunt U.S. Open Cup: 2008

Olimpia
 Liga Nacional de Fútbol de Honduras: 2004–05 Clausura, 2005–06 Apertura, 2005–06 Clausura

Querétaro
 Primera División A: Clausura 2005

Real España
 Liga Nacional de Fútbol de Honduras: 2003–04 Apertura

XV de Piracicaba
 Campeonato Brasileiro Série C: 1995

Individual
Major League Soccer MVP: 2007
MLS Golden Boot Winner: 2007
MLS Newcomer of the Year: 2007
MLS Best XI: 2007

References

External links
MLS player profile

Living people
1978 births
People from Ilha Solteira
Association football forwards
Brazilian footballers
Brazilian expatriate footballers
Alemannia Aachen players
1. FC Köln players
Querétaro F.C. footballers
União Agrícola Barbarense Futebol Clube players
Real C.D. España players
Rio Branco Esporte Clube players
C.D. Olimpia players
D.C. United players
Esporte Clube XV de Novembro (Piracicaba) players
Danubio F.C. players
Toros Neza footballers
Grêmio Catanduvense de Futebol players
Bundesliga players
2. Bundesliga players
Liga Nacional de Fútbol Profesional de Honduras players
Expatriate footballers in Germany
Expatriate footballers in Mexico
Expatriate soccer players in the United States
Expatriate footballers in Honduras
Expatriate footballers in Uruguay
Major League Soccer players
Major League Soccer All-Stars
Designated Players (MLS)
Brazilian expatriate sportspeople in Germany
Brazilian expatriate sportspeople in Mexico
Brazilian expatriate sportspeople in the United States
Brazilian expatriate sportspeople in Honduras
Brazilian expatriate sportspeople in Uruguay
Footballers from São Paulo (state)